The Future: Six Drivers of Global Change is a 2013 book by Al Gore. The six drivers of change described are: "Outgrowth", "The Reinvention of Life and Death", "The Edge", "Earth Inc.", "The Global Mind", and "Power in the Balance". The book covers topics such of climate change, population growth, topsoil depletion, as well as the Internet and global trade.

References

External links

Books by Al Gore
2013 non-fiction books
Random House books